Jaafar Aksikas is a Moroccan-born American academic, activist, media personality and cultural critic. He is currently Professor of Cultural Studies and Media Studies at Columbia College Chicago, United States, where he teaches at the intersection of politics, media and culture.  He is also President and CEO of the Institute for Global Arab Media, Democracy and Culture.  He was also President of the Cultural Studies Association (2014-2016).  He holds a Ph.D in Cultural Studies from George Mason University, an MA in the Humanities from Al Akhawayn University, Morocco, and a B.A. in English Language and Literature from Chouaib Doukkali University, Morocco. His teaching, research and activism are at the intersection of media, politics, law and culture.  His books and edited volumes include:

 
 
 
 
 
 

His other publications include:
Culture Industries: Critical Interventions (2011), an inaugural special journal issue on the culture and media industries for the journal Lateral. 
Critical Purchase in Neoliberal Times, a special journal issue on engaged and community-based forms of cultural studies scholarship for the journal Lateral.

He is also the Editor of the Cultural Studies and Marxism book series for the international publisher Rowman & Littlefield International (2015–present).

His work has appeared in several scholarly journals, including Cultural Studies, Reviews in Cultural Theory, Lateral, Mediterranean Politics, and Cultuur en Migratie. Aksikas has taught and published widely in the fields of Cultural Studies, media/culture industry studies, critical legal studies, American Studies, and Middle Eastern Studies. He also serves on the editorial boards of Cultural Studies and Lateral journals. He has received numerous awards, including the George Mason University VISION Award (2003) and the Marquis Who is Who in America award (2010). He also holds membership at the Phi Beta Delta Honor Society for International Scholars.

He is also the Founding General Editor of Cultural Landscapes, the Founding Coordinator of the Cultural Studies Colloquium Series at Columbia College Chicago, and he serves as a member of the Illinois Network on Islam and Muslim Societies. He also serves as consultant for lawyers and the media on Middle Eastern and North African societies, cultures and politics.

External links 
Personal website
Cultural Studies Association site
The New Project of Cultural Studies Interview with Liz Andrews
Cultural Studies and Marxism

Marxist writers
1974 births
Columbia College Chicago faculty
Living people
Cultural academics
American people of Moroccan descent